Guy A. J. Laboa (born December 9, 1939) is a retired United States Army officer. A veteran of the Vietnam War, his senior command assignments included the 4th Infantry Division and the First United States Army.

Early life
Guy Anthony Jackson Laboa was born in Houston, Texas, on December 9, 1939, the son of Anthony B. LaBoa and Mary Inez (Hill) LaBoa. He graduated from Channelview High School, and in 1962 he received a Bachelor of Science in commercial marketing from Northwestern State University in Natchitoches, Louisiana. A participant in the Reserve Officers' Training Corps program, at his graduation he received his commission in the United States Army as a second lieutenant of Infantry.

Military career

Start of career
LaBoa completed the Infantry Officer Basic Course in 1962. His additional training included the Airborne and Pathfinder courses.

From October 1964 to September 1965, LaBoa served in Vietnam during the Vietnam War. After returning to the United States, he was assigned as supply officer for the 6th Student Battalion at Fort Benning.

In 1966, LaBoa was appointed aide-de-camp to Lieutenant General Louis W. Truman, commander of the Third United States Army at Fort McPherson, Georgia.

During his second deployment to Vietnam, LaBoa served with the 25th Infantry Division as commander of Company A, 1st Battalion, 5th Infantry Regiment and operations officer for 1st Battalion, 5th Infantry. He was selected for promotion to major in 1968.

LaBoa's post-Vietnam assignments included commander of 2nd Battalion, 15th Infantry Regiment from 1977 to 1979. In 1981, LaBoa graduated from the United States Army War College and received a Master of Science in public administration from Shippensburg State University.

In the early and mid 1980s, LaBoa's assignments included assistant chief of staff for plans, operations and training (G-3) and inspector general for the 5th Infantry Division.

General officer
As a colonel, LaBoa commanded 1st Brigade, 8th Infantry Division. He then served as chief of staff for the 8th Infantry Division, and remained in this position until being selected for promotion to brigadier general in 1985. From March 1986 to June 1987, LaBoa served as deputy director of operations in the operations directorate of the Chairman of the Joint Chiefs of Staff. LaBoa's later assignments as a general officer included assistant division commander (support) for the 4th Infantry Division, and director of operations for Forces Command.

LaBoa served as commander of the 4th Infantry Division from October 1991 to October 1993. He served as chief of staff for Forces Command from 1993 to 1995. From May to July 1995, LaBoa commanded Second United States Army as a lieutenant general. When First United States Army and Second Army were combined, LaBoa assumed command of First Army, which he led until his 1997 retirement.

Post-military career
After leaving the army, LaBoa was employed by CIBA Vision as director of daily contact lens manufacturing. He became a resident of Dahlonega, Georgia, and served on the city council from 2004 to 2008.

In 2008, LaBoa joined KBR, Inc. as principal manager for the company's participation in the LOGCAP III program. He was an unsuccessful candidate for the Republican nomination for chairman of the Lumpkin County Board of Commissioners in 2012.

Family
In 1961, LaBoa married Monya Ann Winn (1941–1964). His second wife was Patricia Ann Berry of East Point, Georgia.  LaBoa is the father of three children: Anthony, Tracy, Mary Kaye.

Awards and decorations

In 1992, LaBoa was inducted into Northwestern State University's Hall of Fame, the Long Purple Line.

References

Sources

Internet

Press release

News

Books

Magazines

|-

|-

1939 births
Living people
Military personnel from Houston
People from Dahlonega, Georgia
Northwestern State University alumni
Shippensburg University of Pennsylvania alumni
United States Army War College alumni
United States Army generals
United States Army personnel of the Vietnam War
Recipients of the Distinguished Service Medal (US Army)
Recipients of the Silver Star
Recipients of the Defense Superior Service Medal
Recipients of the Legion of Merit
Recipients of the Air Medal